The News Agents is a daily podcast produced by Global Media & Entertainment in the United Kingdom, and presented by Emily Maitlis, Jon Sopel and Lewis Goodall, with Dino Sofos as Executive Producer. It launched on 30 August 2022, with episodes released from 5pm daily.

Overview
Presented by Emily Maitlis, Jon Sopel and Lewis Goodall, The News Agents is a podcast that examines the day's news stories with a more informal presenting style than media outlets such as the BBC. It is marketed as an alternative to Radio 4’s Today (although Fiona Sturges of The Financial Times has suggested "its real rival is The Rest Is Politics", a political podcast presented by Alastair Campbell and Rory Stewart). It is produced by Dino Sofos, who had previously worked with Maitlis and Sopel on the BBC's Americast podcast, as well as producing The Next Episode and the award-winning Brexitcast (latterly Newscast) podcasts for BBC News, but who left the BBC in November 2021 to establish his own production company, Persephonica, alongside Tom O'Hara.

History
Details of a podcast presented by Maitlis and Sopel were first revealed in February 2022, when it was announced both would be leaving BBC News to join Global. Maitlis, a presenter of Newsnight, and Sopel, the BBC's North America correspondent, had previously worked together on the BBC's Americast podcast. On 22 August, Global confirmed The News Agents would launch the following week, with Maitlis and Sopel presenting from Mondays to Thursdays, and Goodall presenting on Fridays. The podcast received extensive pre-launch publicity, which James Marriott, writing in The Times, has described as a "weeks-long publicity blitz" that promised a "suave up-to-date show that would blast aside the staid, fuddy-duddy stuff on Olde-Worlde radio". A few days before the podcast's launch, Maitlis delivered the 2022 MacTaggart Lecture at the Edinburgh Television Festival during which she spoke of what she believed to be a threat posed to journalism by populist politicians.

The opening edition, titled Trump – Prison or President?, focused on the FBI investigation into Donald Trump's handling of presidential documents and the subsequent raid on his Mar-a-Lago estate, with Anthony Scaramucci, the former White House Director of Communications, appearing as a guest. The presenters adopted a more informal presenting style than they are known for from their work at the BBC, with Maitlis referring to Sopel "Sopes", Scaramucci "Mooch" and Goodall "Luigi", declaring that "everyone has to have a nickname". Subsequent episodes focussed on domestic topics such as the July–September 2022 Conservative Party leadership election and the issues facing the incoming prime minister.

In January 2023, the podcast obtained a leaked letter from Culture Secretary Michelle Donelan to the Prime Minister, Rishi Sunak, in which she recommended the government reverse its plans to privatise Channel 4. 

In an episode released on 27 January 2023, which contained an interview with Nicola Sturgeon, the First Minister of Scotland, she accused some opponents of the Scottish Government's Gender Recognition Reform (Scotland) Bill of using women's rights as a "cloak of acceptability" for transphobia.

On 16 March 2023 it was announced the podcast's presenters would be part of The Podcast Show 2023 in May, alongside Roman Kemp.

Reception

The first edition received a mixed reception, with reviewers praising the quality of its content but expressing concern about the informal approach of its presenters. James Marriott of The Times described it as "slick but a little baffling" with "tantalising glimpses of the much better show that will doubtless be constructed from all the beautiful, uber-professional moving parts that are welded together so oddly in this first episode"., while Sean O'Grady of The Independent felt it was "balanced, informative and analytical" but was less impressed with the presenting style: "The thing I actively disliked about the podcast was the very thing that is supposed to make these exercises so refreshing and fun – that terrible forced chumminess and informality, supposed to be like three old friends gossiping in a bar". Mark Lawson of The Guardian suggested the edition "most resembled the post-show Newsnight green room cool-down, with presenters and contributors speaking slightly more loosely", and that it "is bold of Global" to launch the podcast, but concluded "It remains to be seen, though, if the best use is being made of these latest big-money signings". Judith Woods of The Telegraph was critical of the episode for choosing to focus on an international story rather than focusing on UK news topics "on a day when the [British Medical Association] warned of a doctors’ strike, a police investigation was reopened on an alleged child grooming gang in Hull and Goldman Sachs suggested inflation could top 22 per cent next year". The topic choice was also highlighted by Fiona Sturges of The Financial Times, particularly as the Mar-a-Lago raid was by then an old news story; she highlighted other problems as well: "a surfeit of interviews with commentators you've never heard of; phoney-sounding listener questions; and, Lord help us, the small talk" which "comes over as forced and unfunny".

On 4 September it was reported that The News Agents had topped the Apple UK Podcast Chart.

References

External links
The News Agents at Global Player

Audio podcasts
2022 podcast debuts
British podcasts
2022 establishments in the United Kingdom